Molly Hattersley (née Edith Mary Loughran, born 5 February 1931) is a British education consultant. Hattersley was previously a teacher and headteacher, noted for shaping education policy, having overseen experimental desegregation of the British school system in the 1970s under the Labour government. She married Labour Party minister Roy Hattersley in 1956.

Career 
Hattersley began her career as the headteacher of the first comprehensive school in Sheffield. As headteacher of Creighton School from 1974, Molly Hattersley oversaw the centrepiece of a Labour Party educational experiment. With Creighton situated in the middle-class, largely white suburb of Muswell Hill, it was decided to integrate a large number of Afro-Caribbean and other ethnic minority children into the school from distant parts of the borough in an attempt to maximise education choice and social interaction – a policy based heavily on the United States' then-current system of desegregation busing. In 1975, before this new intake had worked through the school, around one-third of the Sixth Form was either a first-generation immigrant, or had a surname of Cypriot or Asian origin.

In the early 1980s Hattersley appeared in Gender, a documentary on equality in the education system.

Since 1990 Hattersley has worked as an educational consultant, also serving as a visiting fellow at the Institute of Education, University of London (Management Development Centre). She has also worked at the London School of Economics and Political Science.

Publications and talks 
Molly Hattersley is the author of The Appraisal of Headteachers (1992) . She has published in educational journals including Management in Education, and has given talks on equal opportunities in education.

Personal life 
Molly Hattersley was the daughter of Michael and Sally Loughran, and the wife of Labour Party minister Roy Hattersley, whom she married in 1956. After living in London they moved in 1997 to Bakewell in Derbyshire. They divorced in April 2013 after 57 years of marriage, having been separated for five years. They had no children.

References 

1931 births
Living people
Heads of schools in Yorkshire
English socialists
British baronesses
Spouses of life peers